The Italian Medicines Agency (Agenzia italiana del farmaco, AIFA) is the public institution responsible for the regulatory activity of pharmaceuticals  in Italy.

See also
European Medicines Agency
Istituto Superiore di Sanità

External links

Medical and health organisations based in Italy
Drugs in Italy